The 2018 African Wrestling Championships was held in Port Harcourt, Nigeria from 7 to 11 February 2018.

Medal table

Team ranking

Medal summary

Men's freestyle

Men's Greco-Roman

Women's freestyle

References 

African Wrestling Championships
Africa
African Wrestling Championships
Wrestling Championships
African Wrestling Championships
African Wrestling Championships
International sports competitions hosted by Nigeria